Alepisaurus ferox, the long snouted lancetfish, longnose lancetfish, or cannibal fish, is a species of lancetfish found in the ocean depths down to 1,830 m (6,000 ft).

It is often called the cannibal fish because numerous individuals have been caught after having devoured other lancetfish.

Habitat and ecosystem

Habitat 
A. ferox lives in deep-water oceans in the Western and Eastern Pacific from the Aleutian Islands to Chile and the Western Atlantic from the Gulf of Maine to the Gulf of Mexico, including the Caribbean Sea, and the Eastern Atlantic, Indian Ocean, Northwest Atlantic, and the China Sea. The A. ferox can also be found as far north as Russia. Due to the range of habitat the A. ferox can be found in, it can be caught with fisheries that are catching tuna. The daily vertical migrations from the epipelagic all the way down to the mesopelagic or bathypelagic zones are taken by the A. ferox in order to find food.

Predators 
The known predators for A. ferox include yellowfin tuna, opah, fur seals, Pacific cod, and salmon shark. The predators are known to change for A. ferox depending on the region of the ocean it is inhabiting.

Effect on ecosystem 
A. ferox is known for its predatory and prey behaviors in the south-western and central-western Pacific Ocean. In these regions of the Pacific Ocean, there have been studies done on the effects this species has on the surrounding ecosystems and whether those impacts are negative or positive for said ecosystems. When A. ferox was removed from these regions of the Pacific Ocean, there was a negative effect on the ecosystems that showed the importance of this species as both a predatory and prey type.

Characteristics and behavior

Appearance 
The dorsal fin of A. ferox has about three rays strongly exerted, beginning with the third or fourth ray. It is known to have a large mouth with two fangs. It is generally pale, iridescent, and dark around the dorsal fin; all of its fins are either dark brown or black.

The stomach of A. ferox is similar to that of the other species in the suborder of Alepisauroidea. The gut of the A. ferox is a large, blind-sac that also has a very unique biological response to food. The stomach will store food in the stomach and slowly digest the contents, allowing for a more in depth understanding of the exact diet the A. ferox have.

The large, sharp teeth of the lancetfish have two functions; breaking apart organisms too large to swallow whole, and cutting prey’s trunk muscles to stop the prey struggling. The teeth are not used for chewing otherwise.

Diet 
The main diet of A. ferox can vary depending on the area it inhabits. There have been studies done that show the diet variation  along with studies that show there is no diet variation. A. ferox is known to eat from 98 different prey families and even man made materials, like plastics, that find their way into the ocean.

A. ferox is known as a migratory species as well as a cannibalistic one. A. ferox is known to travel down to as far as  down in order to hunt. A study done in Suruga Bay, Japan explored the contents of the stomach of various A. ferox that had washed ashore and found that along with indigestible materials, there were species of sea life that were found at the surface, middle, and deep sea layers. This study showed how the A. ferox is a deep sea diving species that can easily migrate between the different layers of the sea.

A. ferox is referred to as the cannibal fish, due to its conspecific predation habits. the extent of cannibalism depended on the availability of non-conspecific prey. These patterns range from 0–45.5% in frequency and depend on the availability and ease of finding other prey but ultimately make up a substantial part of the diet of A. ferox. Size is an influencing factor as small lancetfish will not turn to cannibalism as quickly as larger fish.

Reproduction 
The fish are simultaneous hermaphrodites, meaning they have both male and female reproductive parts at the same time. Unlike other hermaphroditic fishes, A. ferox has two distinct testicular lobes that are independent from the ovarian region. This species also an absence of a pair of diverticulae in the female reproductive section, which in other hermaphrodites is used for spermatophore uptake.

Human impact

Plastic consumption 
Plastic is ingested by approximately 30% of all A. ferox. Macroplastic fragments and rope fragments were the most commonly found plastic in the stomach contents with white and clear colored plastics seeming to be favored.

Bycatch 
A. ferox is commonly caught as bycatch for longline fisheries and is never the intended target. In the Philippines, studies of longline tuna fisheries revealed that they usually caught more A. ferox than any tuna. A. ferox also accounts for 2% of all bycatch by circle and j hook longline fisheries in the Bay of Bengal. Survival of being bycatch in these types of nets is low - only one third of A. ferox survive.

References

Further reading 

Cosmopolitan animals
Alepisauridae
Fish described in 1833